Times Building may refer to:

Los Angeles Times Building, the building at 1st and Spring Streets in Los Angeles, California that has housed The Los Angeles Times since 1935
One Times Square, the building at One Times Square in New York City that housed The New York Times from 1904 to 1913
The New York Times Building, the building at 620 Eighth Avenue in New York City that currently houses The New York Times
The New York Times Building (former), the building at 229 West 43rd Street in New York City that housed The New York Times from 1913 to 2007
Times Building-Lodge Hall, in Canal Winchester, Ohio, which housed The Winchester Times
Times Square Building, Seattle, Washington, formerly known as Times Building and listed on the NRHP as that
The Old Times Building, the building at 228 East Holmes Avenue in Huntsville, Alabama, that's listed on the NRHP